Aleksey Igorevich Khovanskiy (born 6 June 1987) is a Russian foil fencer, who earned a team bronze medal in the 2009 World Fencing Championships and four team silver medals in the European Fencing Championships (2007, 2008, 2009 and 2010).

His best results in the Fencing World Cup were a third place in the 2010 Challenge International de Paris, in the 2012 Saint-Petersburg  Grand Prix, and in the 2013 Copa Villa.

External links
 
  (archive)
 
   (in English)
 
 

1987 births
Living people
Russian male foil fencers
Fencers at the 2012 Summer Olympics
Olympic fencers of Russia
People from Odintsovo
Fencers at the 2015 European Games
European Games medalists in fencing
Universiade medalists in fencing
Universiade bronze medalists for Russia
European Games bronze medalists for Russia
Medalists at the 2011 Summer Universiade
Medalists at the 2013 Summer Universiade
Sportspeople from Moscow Oblast
21st-century Russian people